Iowa Highway 346 (Iowa 346) is a short state highway in north-northeastern Iowa.  Iowa 346 begins at U.S. Route 218 / Iowa Highway 27 at Nashua, Iowa and ends at the intersection of U.S. Highway 18 and U.S. Highway 63 south of New Hampton.

Route description

Iowa Highway 346 begins at exit 220 of U.S. Route 218 (US 218) and Iowa Highway 27, the Avenue of the Saints highway, west of Nashua.  It heads east and intersects Amherst Boulevard, which is the former alignment of US 218 through Nashua.  It crosses the Cedar River adjacent to the dam which holds back Red Cedar Lake and passes the Big Four Fairgrounds before leaving Nashua.

From Nashua, Iowa 346 takes an S-curve to the north and east at Bradford.  After exiting the curve, it heads due east for the remainder of its length along section lines.  The route travels  through rolling farmland before ending at an interchange with U.S. Highway 18 and U.S. Highway 63 in Richland Township.

History
Iowa Highway 346 was originally a spur route connecting Bradford to U.S. Route 218 in Nashua.  By 1954, Iowa 346 had been extended east to the intersection of U.S. Highway 18 and U.S. Highway 63 west of Fredericksburg.  After the Avenue of the Saints corridor was constructed and opened in 2003, the western end of Iowa 346 was moved  to the west.

Major intersections

References

346
Transportation in Chickasaw County, Iowa